Tengwe is a rural business centre in Hurungwe District in the province of Mashonaland West, Zimbabwe situated about 70 km north-west of Chinhoyi and approximately 40 km south of Karoi. Tobacco is mainly produced in the area.

it has a police station, clinic and a school. The clinic is called Tengwe Clinic and the school is called Mshowe Primary and High School. In Tengwe there is a two big shops which are Farm and City and Rama wholesale.

There is two busters econet and netone which are the major network supplier.

Tengwe has a nice club which was built by the whites long ago but it's still nice up to current.

Tengwe it's nice place to visit since it's known as a cool place.

In Tengwe there are some churches which include the following Word of Truth Ministries International, ZAOGA (FIF), Salvation Army, Methodist church and AFM

it also has a fuel station along the road.

Populated places in Mashonaland West Province
Karoi District